Albert Bierstadt (January 7, 1830 – February 18, 1902) was a German-American painter best known for his lavish, sweeping landscapes of the American West. He joined several journeys of the Westward Expansion to paint the scenes. He was not the first artist to record the sites, but he was the foremost painter of them for the remainder of the 19th century.

Bierstadt was born in Prussia, but his family moved to the United States when he was one year old. He returned to study painting for several years in Düsseldorf. He became part of the second generation of the Hudson River School in New York, an informal group of like-minded painters who started painting along the Hudson River. Their style was based on carefully detailed paintings with romantic, almost glowing lighting, sometimes called luminism. Bierstadt was an important interpreter of the western landscape, and he is also grouped with the Rocky Mountain School.

Early life and education

Bierstadt was born in Solingen, Rhine Province, Prussia on January 7, 1830.  He was the son of Christina M. (Tillmans) and Henry Bierstadt, a cooper. His older brothers were prominent stereo view photographers Edward Bierstadt and Charles Bierstadt. Albert was just a year old when his family immigrated to New Bedford, Massachusetts in 1831. He made clever crayon sketches in his youth and developed a taste for art.

In 1851, Bierstadt began to paint in oils. He returned to Germany in 1853 and studied painting for several years in Düsseldorf with members of its informal school of painting. After returning to New Bedford in 1857, he taught drawing and painting briefly before devoting himself full-time to painting.

Career

In 1858, Bierstadt exhibited a large painting of a Swiss landscape at the National Academy of Design, which gained him positive critical reception and honorary membership in the Academy. Bierstadt began painting scenes in New England and upstate New York, including in the Hudson River Valley. He was part of a group of artists known as the Hudson River School.

In 1859, Bierstadt traveled westward in the company of Frederick W. Lander, a land surveyor for the U.S. government, to see those western American landscapes for his work. He returned to a studio he had taken at the Tenth Street Studio Building in New York with sketches for numerous paintings he then finished. In 1860, he was elected a member of the National Academy of Design; he received medals in Austria, Bavaria, Belgium, and Germany.

In 1863, Bierstadt traveled West again, this time in the company of the author Fitz Hugh Ludlow, whose wife he later married. The pair spent seven weeks in the Yosemite Valley. Throughout the 1860s, Bierstadt used studies from this trip as the source for large-scale paintings for exhibition and he continued to visit the American West throughout his career. The immense canvases he produced after his trips with Lander and Ludlow established him as the preeminent painter of the western American landscape. Bierstadt's technical proficiency, earned through his study of European landscape, was crucial to his success as a painter of the American West and accounted for his popularity in disseminating views of the Rocky Mountains to those who had not seen them.

During the American Civil War (1861 to 1865), Bierstadt was drafted in 1863 and paid for a substitute to serve in his place. By 1862, he had completed one Civil War painting Guerrilla Warfare, Civil War based on his brief experiences with soldiers stationed at Camp Cameron in 1861. That painting was based on a stereoscopic photograph taken by his brother Edward Bierstadt, who operated a photography studio at Langley's Tavern in Virginia. The painting received a positive review when it was exhibited at the Brooklyn Art Association at the Brooklyn Academy of Music in December 1861. Curator Eleanor Jones Harvey observed that the painting, created from photographs, "is quintessentially that of a voyeur, privy to the stories and unblemished by the violence and brutality of first-hand combat experience."

Financial recognition confirmed his status: The Rocky Mountains, Lander's Peak, completed in 1863, was purchased for $25,000 in 1865, the equivalent of almost $400,000 in 2020.

In 1867, Bierstadt returned to Europe, arriving in London where he exhibited two landscape paintings in a private reception with Queen Victoria. He then travelled through Europe for the next two years, painting new works while also cultivating social and business contacts to sustain the market for his art on the continent. For example, he painted Among the Sierra Nevada, California in his Rome studio, displaying it in Berlin and London before having it shipped to the U.S. His exhibition pieces both impressed European audiences and furthered the idea of the American West as a land of promise during a period when European emigration to the U.S. was increasing. Bierstadt's choice of grandiose subjects was matched by his entrepreneurial flair. His exhibitions of individual works were accompanied by promotion, ticket sales, and, in the words of one critic, a "vast machinery of advertisement and puffery."

Bierstadt's popularity in the U.S. remained strong during his European tour. The publicity generated by his Yosemite Valley paintings in 1868 led a number of explorers to request his presence as part of their westward expeditions. The Atchison, Topeka, and Santa Fe Railroad also commissioned him to visit and paint the Grand Canyon and surrounding region.

Despite his popular success, Bierstadt was criticized by some contemporaries for the romanticism evident in his choice of subjects and for his use of light, which they found excessive. Some critics objected to Bierstadt's paintings of Native Americans based on their belief that including Indigenous Americans "marred" the "impression of solitary grandeur."

His wife, Rosalie, was diagnosed with tuberculosis in 1876, and Bierstadt spent increasing amounts of time with her in the warmer climate of Nassau in the Bahamas until her death in 1893. He also maintained travel between the western United States, Canada, and his studio in New York.

Though his painting career continued later into his life, Bierstadt's work fell increasingly out of critical favor and was increasingly attacked for its theatrical tone. In 1882, a fire destroyed Bierstadt's studio at Irvington, New York and, with it, many of his paintings.

Bierstadt was a prolific artist, having completed over 500 paintings during his lifetime. Yet by the time of his death on February 18, 1902, the taste for epic landscape painting had long since subsided. Bierstadt was buried at the Rural Cemetery in New Bedford, Massachusetts and remained largely forgotten for nearly 60 years.

Posthumous reception
Interest in Bierstadt's work was renewed in the 1960s with the exhibition of his small oil studies. Modern opinions of Bierstadt have been divided. Some critics have regarded his work as gaudy, oversized, extravagant champions of Manifest Destiny. Others have noted that his landscapes helped create support for the conservation movement and the establishment of Yellowstone National Park. His work has been placed in a favorable context, as stated in 1987:

On the other hand, his work has been also been criticized as largely an imaginary depiction of nature, and even "soulless" in its execution.

Existing work

 1853 – Majesty of the Mountains
 1855 – The Old Mill
 1855 – The Portico of Octavia
 1855 – Westphalia
 1858 – Lake Lucerne, c. 1853, oil on canvas, National Gallery of Art, Washington, D.C.
 1859 – The Wolf River, Kansas, c. 1859, oil on canvas, Detroit Institute of Arts, Detroit, Michigan
 1861 – Echo Lake, Franconia Mountains, NH, Smith College Museum of Art, Smith College, Northampton, Massachusetts
 1863 – The Rocky Mountains, Lander's Peak, oil on canvas, Metropolitan Museum of Art, New York City, New York
 1864 – Cho-looke, the Yosemite Fall, oil on canvas, Timken Museum of Art, San Diego, California
 1864 – Valley of the Yosemite, oil on paper, Museum of Fine Arts, Boston, Massachusetts
1865 - Looking Down Yosemite Valley, Birmingham Museum of Art, Alabama
 1866 – Yosemite Valley, Oil on canvas on panel-back stretcher, Cleveland Museum of Art, Cleveland, Ohio
 1866 – On the Hudson River Near Irvington, 1866–70, oil on paper, Berkshire Museum, Pittsfield, Massachusetts
 1866 – A Storm in the Rocky Mountains, Mt. Rosalie, oil on canvas, Brooklyn Museum, New York City, New York
 1868 – Connecticut River Valley, Claremont, New Hampshire, 1868, oil on canvas, Berkshire Museum, Pittsfield, Massachusetts
 1868 – In the Sierras, Fogg Museum, Harvard University, Cambridge, Massachusetts
 1868 – Among the Sierra Nevada, California, Smithsonian American Art Museum, Washington, D.C.
 1869 – Glen Ellis Falls, oil on canvas, Zimmerli Art Museum, New Brunswick, New Jersey
 1870 - Sierra Nevada Morning, oil on canvas, Gilcrease Museum, Tulsa, Oklahoma
 1870 – Puget Sound on the Pacific Coast, oil on canvas, Seattle Art Museum, Seattle, Washington
 1871 – Domes of Yosemite, c. 1871, St. Johnsbury Athenaeum, St. Johnsbury, Vermont
 1874 – Giant Redwood Trees of California,  c. 1874, oil on canvas, Berkshire Museum, Pittsfield, Massachusetts
 1875 – Mount Adams, Washington, 1875, oil on canvas, Princeton University Art Museum, Princeton, New Jersey
 1876 – Mount Corcoran, c. 1876–77, oil on canvas, Corcoran Gallery of Art, Washington, D.C.
 1888 – The Last of the Buffalo, oil on canvas, Corcoran Gallery of Art, Washington, D.C.
 1889 – Alaskan Coast Range, c. 1889, Smithsonian American Art Museum, Washington, D.C.
 1891 – The Last of the Buffalo, c. 1891, vintage photogravure, Valley Fine Art Gallery, Aspen, Colorado
 1895 – The Morteratsch Glacier Upper Engadine Valley – Pontresina

Selected paintings

Legacy and honors

 Because of Bierstadt's interest in mountain landscapes, Mount Bierstadt and Bierstadt Lake in Colorado are named in his honor.  Bierstadt was probably the first European to visit the summit of Mount Evans in 1863, 1.5 miles from Mount Bierstadt.  Bierstadt named it Mount Rosa, a reference to both Monte Rosa above Zermatt and, Rosalie Ludlow, his future wife, but the name was changed from Rosalie to Evans in 1895 in honor of Colorado governor John Evans.
 In 1998, the United States Postal Service issued a set of 20 commemorative stamps entitled "Four Centuries of American Art", one of which featured Albert Bierstadt's The Last of the Buffalo.  In 2008, the USPS issued a commemorative stamp in its "American Treasures" series featuring Bierstadt's 1864 painting Valley of the Yosemite.
 William Bliss Baker, another landscape artist, studied under Bierstadt.

References

Further reading
 Anderson, Nancy K. et al.  Albert Bierstadt, Art & Enterprise, New York: Hudson Hills Press, 1990.
 Barringer, Tim and Wilton, Andrew. American Sublime: Landscape Painting in the United States 1820–1880, Princeton University Press, 2002. .
 Hendricks, Gordon.  Albert Bierstadt, Painter of the American West, New York: Harrison House/Harry N. Abrams, Inc., 1988.
 
 Miller, Angela. "Albert Bierstadt, Landscape Aesthetics, and the Meanings of the West in the Civil War Era". Art Institute of Chicago Museum Studies 27, no. 1 (Terrain of Freedom: American Art and the Civil War) (2001): 40–59 and 101–102.  . .

External links

 
 Albert Bierstadt (albertbierstadt.org)
 Albert Bierstadt Paintings at fineartamerica.com
 White Mountain paintings by Albert Bierstadt
 A finding aid to the Albert Bierstadt letter collection, 1880–1893 in the Archives of American Art, Smithsonian Institution
 "Against His Grain: Albert Bierstadt's 'Clouds Over the Prairie MONA Moment, Museum of Nebraska Art
 Gallery of Bierstadt's Paintings
 The Winterthur Library—Overview of an archival collection on Albert Bierstadt.
 Albert Bierstadt Paintings Gallery—345 images online
 Albert Bierstadt's Biography at The R.W. Norton Art Gallery
 Giant Redwood Trees' will fall at Berkshire Museum despite interpretive value", The Berkshire Eagle, June 30, 2018
 Albert Bierstadt, WikiArt
 

1830 births
1902 deaths
19th-century American painters
19th-century American male artists
American male painters
American landscape painters
Artists of the American West
Prussian emigrants to the United States
Hudson River School painters
Luminism (American art style)
People from Solingen
People from the Rhine Province
People from Irvington, New York
Düsseldorf school of painting
Members of the American Academy of Arts and Letters